Becky Lam is a Hong Kong actress. She won the Hong Kong Film Award for Best Actress at the 2nd Hong Kong Film Awards.

Filmography
 1982 Lonely Fifteen - Becky

Awards 
 1983 Hong Kong Film Award for Best Actress for Lonely Fifteen.

References

External links
 

1966 births
Living people
Hong Kong film actresses
20th-century Hong Kong actresses